Dewey Warren (born May 7, 1945) is a former American football quarterback for the University of Tennessee football team and the American Football League's Cincinnati Bengals. Warren was nicknamed "The Swamp Rat" due to his early years growing up near the marshlands of the Vernon River in Georgia.

College career
In three seasons with Warren as the starting quarterback of the Tennessee Volunteers, their record was 19-6. He was the first UT quarterback to pass for more than a 1,000 yards in a season.

During his sophomore season, he led the Vols to a win against the Rose Bowl-bound UCLA Bruins and a berth in the Bluebonnet Bowl.  

Before Warren took over as quarterback, Tennessee's single-season records were 75 passing attempts, 36 completions (by Johnny Majors in the 1950s), and 552 yards. Under coach Doug Dickey's wide-open T-formation offense, in 1966, Warren threw 229 passes with 136 completions and 1,716 yards.

Warren led Tennessee to an 8-3 record in that transformational 1966 season, followed by an 18-12 win over Syracuse University in the 1966 Gator Bowl, for which he was named the game's MVP. The following year, the Vols went 9-2, won the Southeastern Conference championship and were recognized by Litkenhous as national champions before a 26-24 loss to the University of Oklahoma in the Orange Bowl. He finished eighth in the voting for the 1967 Heisman Trophy.

Warren ended his UT career with 3,357 yards passing and 27 touchdowns.

Professional career
Warren was selected in the sixth round (155th overall) of the 1968 NFL/AFL Draft. 

He spent one season with the American Football League's Cincinnati Bengals in the team's expansion year, playing in seven games in 1968 and starting three. Sharing time with Bengals quarterbacks John Stofa and Sam Wyche, Warren completed 47 passes in 80 attempts (58.8 percent) for 506 yards and one touchdown.  In 1969, Warren played for the Las Vegas Cowboys of the Continental Football League.

Coaching career
Warren coached at Brigham Young University, Kansas State University, Tennessee, and the University of the South.

Warren was instrumental in revolutionizing college football under LaVell Edwards at Brigham Young. Edwards, who had spent his career as a defensive coach, became head coach in 1972; he knew that BYU lacked the blue-chip athletes necessary to win consistently with a conventional run-oriented game, so handed the offense to Warren, who had been hired to install a passing attack.  

Warren's offense turned every running play into a passing play, and overwhelmed defenses with four and five receivers, coming from every possible position in the offense. Although Warren left BYU after only two seasons, his offense, led by quarterback Gary Sheide, was already setting records. BYU continues to use his offense, with further refinements, today.

Personal
Warren is now the host of a sports talk radio show in Knoxville, Tennessee, where he lives, and also plays in charity golf tournaments.

See also
 List of NCAA major college football yearly passing leaders
Other American Football League players

References

1945 births
Living people
American football quarterbacks
American Football League players
BYU Cougars football coaches
Cincinnati Bengals players
Kansas State Wildcats football coaches
Sewanee Tigers football coaches
Tennessee Volunteers football coaches
Tennessee Volunteers football players
Coaches of American football from Georgia (U.S. state)
Players of American football from Savannah, Georgia